Zinc finger protein 679 is a protein that in humans is encoded by the ZNF679 gene.

References

Further reading 

Human proteins